Saint-Pierre-Langers is a commune in the Manche department in Normandy in north-western France.

Heraldry

Personalities linked to the commune 
 Philippe Badin, 18th abbot of La Lucerne Abbey (?-1452), who laid the first stone at the fortress of Granville.
 Anatole France, stayed here twice in his youth and described the commune in a chapter 11 of La Vie en fleur.

See also
Communes of the Manche department

References

Saintpierrelangers